Galeichthys ater, the black sea catfish, is a species of sea catfish found in South Africa and Namibia. It grows to a length of about  TL and feeds on benthic organisms with annelid worms making up a significant portion of their diet. They are a minor component of the fishery industry.

References
 

Ariidae
Marine fauna of Southern Africa
Fish described in 1861